Leslie Weston (24 July 1896 – 13 October 1975) was a British actor who was also a radio and variety comedian.

Selected filmography
 Glamour Girl (1938)
 They Drive by Night (1938)
 Two for Danger (1940)
 We Dive at Dawn (1943)
 Send for Paul Temple (1946)
 Green Fingers (1947)
 My Brother Jonathan (1948)
 Corridor of Mirrors (1948)
 Sleeping Car to Trieste (1948)
 It's Hard to Be Good (1948)
 Poet's Pub (1949)
 Last Holiday (1950) (Hôtel Staff)
 The Lady with the Lamp (1951)
 The Last Page (1952)
 The Woman's Angle (1952)
 Derby Day (1952)
 The Night Won't Talk (1952)
 Folly to Be Wise (1953)
 The Embezzler (1954)
 Betrayed (1954) as "Pop"
 Above Us the Waves (1955)
 The Last Man to Hang? (1956)
 The Green Man (1956)
 Three Men in a Boat (1956)
 Manuela (1957)
 High Flight (1957)
 The House of the Seven Hawks (1959)

References

External links
 

English male film actors
English male television actors
1896 births
1975 deaths